Cantharidella beachportensis, common name the Beachport top shell, is a species of sea snail, a marine gastropod mollusk in the family Trochidae, the top snails.

Description
The size of the shell attains 6 mm.

Distribution
This marine species is endemic to Australia and occurs off South Australia and Western Australia.

References

 Cotton, B.C. & Godfrey, F.K. 1934. South Australian Shells (including descriptions of new genera and species). Part 12, Trochidae (continued). South Australian Naturalist 15(4): 106-121, pl. 1, figs 1-12
 Cotton, B.C. 1959. South Australian Mollusca. Archaeogastropoda. Handbook of the Flora and Fauna of South Australia. Adelaide : South Australian Government Printer 449 pp.
 Wilson, B. 1993. Australian Marine Shells. Prosobranch Gastropods. Kallaroo, Western Australia : Odyssey Publishing Vol. 1 408 pp.

External links
 To World Register of Marine Species

beachportensis
Gastropods of Australia
Gastropods described in 1934